The Nugget is a 2002 Australian comedy film about three friends who find the world's largest nugget of gold.

Storyline
The story concerns a group of three road workers who stumble upon the world's biggest nugget of gold, and become instant millionaires — or so they think. The road workers are mates from way back, and each weekend they go out to an old goldmining site hoping to strike it rich. Each weekend they come back with nothing but a hangover. But then everything changes when they discover the world's biggest nugget — worth many millions of dollars.

Cast

Box office
The Nugget grossed $1,920,993 at the box office in Australia.

See also
Cinema of Australia

References

External links

The Nugget at Oz Movies
 
The Nugget at the National Film and Sound Archive

APRA Award winners
2002 films
Australian buddy films
Australian comedy films
2000s English-language films
2002 comedy films
Films directed by Bill Bennett
Films scored by Nigel Westlake
Gold rushes
2000s Australian films